Viewers' Viewpoint was a British television series which aired 1947 to 1948 on the BBC. Consisting of five episodes, the series presented discussions on television programmes with critics and viewers. It was one of the earliest television programmes about television itself, along with U.S. series Eye Witness from the same period.

References

External links
Viewers' Viewpoint on IMDb

1940s British television series
1947 British television series debuts
1948 British television series endings
Lost BBC episodes
BBC Television shows
Black-and-white British television shows